Line 4 of the Hangzhou Metro is a rapid transit line in Hangzhou.

Description

Phase 1
Phase 1 of the line started operation since 2015. Running northeast–southwest, the line connects Hangzhou East railway station, Qianjiang New City and Binjiang District. Part of the line ( to Shuicheng Bridge) runs along the north bank of Qiantang River.

Phase 2
This extension was opened on 21 February 2022.

Opening timeline

Stations
Legend
 - Operational
 - Under construction

See also
 Hangzhou Metro

References

04
Railway lines opened in 2015
2015 establishments in China
Standard gauge railways in China